The Kukeri Nunataks (Kukerski Nunatatsi \'ku-ker-ski 'nu-na-ta-tsi\) are two rocky peaks
The Kukeri Nunataks are situated in the north foothills of the Tangra Mountains, 200 metre away from each other.

Nunatuk is originally an Inuit word referring to rocky peaks amid ice/snow, while Kukeri are costumed and masked figures (i.e. mummers) who appear in folk rituals and folklore in Bulgaria.

Maps
 L.L. Ivanov et al. Antarctica: Livingston Island and Greenwich Island, South Shetland Islands. Scale 1:100000 topographic map. Sofia: Antarctic Place-names Commission of Bulgaria, 2005.
 L.L. Ivanov. Antarctica: Livingston Island and Greenwich, Robert, Snow and Smith Islands. Scale 1:120000 topographic map.  Troyan: Manfred Wörner Foundation, 2009.

References
 Kukeri Nunataks. SCAR Composite Gazetteer of Antarctica
 Bulgarian Antarctic Gazetteer. Antarctic Place-names Commission. (details in Bulgarian, basic data in English)

External links
 Kukeri Nunataks. Copernix satellite image

Nunataks of Livingston Island